Taunton Deane Borough Council in Somerset, England was elected every four years. The first elections to the council were held in 1973, ahead of it coming into being in 1974. The last election was held in 2015. The council was abolished in 2019 when the district merged with neighbouring West Somerset district to become Somerset West and Taunton.

Political control
From the first election to the council in 1973 until its abolition in 2019, political control of the council was held by the following parties:

Leadership
The leaders of the council from 1974 to 2019 were:

John Williams also served as leader of the shadow authority for Somerset West and Taunton during 20182019 ahead of the new council coming into force, but was unsuccessful in securing a seat on the new council at its first elections in May 2019.

Council elections
1973 Taunton Deane District Council election
1976 Taunton Deane Borough Council election
1979 Taunton Deane Borough Council election (New ward boundaries)
1983 Taunton Deane Borough Council election
1987 Taunton Deane Borough Council election (New ward boundaries & borough boundary changes also took place)
1991 Taunton Deane Borough Council election
1995 Taunton Deane Borough Council election
1999 Taunton Deane Borough Council election (New ward boundaries)
2003 Taunton Deane Borough Council election
2007 Taunton Deane Borough Council election (New ward boundaries increased the number of seats by 2)
2011 Taunton Deane Borough Council election
2015 Taunton Deane Borough Council election

District result maps

By-election results

1995-1999

1999-2003

2003-2007

2007-2011

2011-2019

References

By-election results

External links
Taunton Deane Borough Council

 
Council elections in Somerset
Taunton Deane